Following is a list of senators of Gers, people who have represented the department of Gers in the Senate of France.

Third Republic 

Senators for Gers under the French Third Republic were:

Anselme Batbie (1876–1887)
Louis Lacave-Laplagne (1876–1897)
Philippe de Montesquiou-Fezensac (1887–1897)
Paul Destieux-Junca (1896–1920)
Louis Aucoin (1897–1906)
Alexandre Laterrade (1897–1906)
Odilon Lannelongue (1906–1911)
Frédéric Sancet (1906–1920)
Paul Decker-David (1912–1918)
Joseph Masclanis (1920–1924)
Jean-Baptiste Noulens (1920–1924)
Jean Philip (1920–1941)
Isidore Tournan (1924–1939)
Abel Gardey (1924–1941)

Fourth Republic

Senators for Gers under the French Fourth Republic were:

Auguste Sempé (1946–1948)
Louis Lafforgue (1948–1955)
Paul-Émile Descomps (1948–1959)
Abel Sempé (1955–1959)

Fifth Republic 

Senators for Gers under the French Fifth Republic:

Louis Leygue (1959–1962)
Abel Sempé (1959–1989)
Henri Tournan (1962–1980)
Marc Castex (1980–1989)
Robert Castaing (1989–1998)
Aubert Garcia (1989–1998)
Yves Rispat (1998–2008)
Aymeri de Montesquiou (1998–2015)
Franck Montaugé from 2014
Raymond Vall (2008–2014) and from 2015

References

Sources

 
Gers